Roman Catholic Diocese of León may refer to the following Latin Catholic ecclesiastical jurisdictions :

 Roman Catholic Diocese of León in Spain
 Roman Catholic Diocese of León in Nicaragua
 Roman Catholic Diocese of León in Mexico, former; now a Metropolitan archbishopric